USS Baltimore was a ship of the United States Navy.

This 20-gun ship was built in 1798 by Joseph Caverly in Baltimore, Maryland, as Adriana. She was purchased with funds donated by the citizens of Baltimore to the Navy on 23 May 1798, renamed Baltimore, and placed under the command of Captain Isaac Phillips.

In August 1798 the Baltimore was ordered to join the Constellation and convoy a fleet of merchantmen home from Havana, Cuba. Late in 1798, Baltimore and Constitution were escorting a large convoy to Havana, when the latter sprung her bowsprit and returned home. Baltimore later fell in with two British frigates, on 16 November 1798, who impressed 55 of her crew (50 were returned). On his return to the United States, Captain Phillips was dismissed for permitting an "outrage to the American flag". The incident also created much anti-British feeling among the Americans.

During 1799 Baltimore took two prizes, and the following year three more, as well as recapturing three American vessels which had fallen into French hands. At the close of the Quasi-War with France, she carried the ratified peace treaty to France. Upon her return, Baltimore was sold at Philadelphia in 1801.

References

Quasi-War ships of the United States
Age of Sail naval ships of the United States
Ships built in Baltimore
1798 ships